The tribal Kukna (Kokna) peoples speak a Kukna dialect and Dhodia peoples speak a Dhodia dialect in parts of Gujarat, Dadra and Nagar Haveli and Daman and Diu, Madhya Pradesh, Maharashtra and Rajasthan.

They can speak and write in Gujarati, Hindi, Marathi and Rajasthani languages; that depend on the states or areas, where they live.

References
dhodia Language

External links
 Dhodia Community
 RDG
 Dhodia FaceBook Page
 Dhodia FaceBook Group
 Dhodia Website
 Dhodia Blog
 Dhodia Videos
 Dhodia History
 Dhodia Population
 Dhodia Language
 Dhodia Religion
 Dhodia Kul(કુળ)
 Dhodia Trusts(મંડળો)
 Dhodia SocialServants
 Dhodia Rituals(વિધિઓ)
 Dhodia Book1:અહા આમું ઢોડિયા - શ્રી.કુલીન પટેલ
 Dhodia Book2:ઢોડિયા જાતી: બોલી,સાહિત્ય અને સંસકૃતિ - સ્વ.શ્રી મંછારામભાઈ નારણદાસ પટેલ
 Dhodia Book3:વડલો

Hindi languages
Bhil